The 103rd Regiment of Foot (Volunteer Hunters) was a British Army regiment formed at Bury St Edmunds in October 1760. It took part, alongside the Royal Marines, in the Capture of Belle Île in April 1761 during the Seven Years' War. It was then disbanded in England in 1763.

Lieutenant-Colonel Thomas Oswald was its colonel from 1761 to 1763.

References

External links

Infantry regiments of the British Army
Military units and formations disestablished in 1763